Mahatta Fort ("the station" in Arabic) is located in central Sharjah in the United Arab Emirates. The fort was built by the Ruler of Sharjah in 1932 to afford protection for the passengers and staff of Imperial Airways. It was the first British establishment on the Trucial Coast, after an agreement was struck between the British government (on behalf of Imperial Airways) and the ruler of Sharjah in June 1932. The Fort was used by the Royal Air Force in World War II and the Trucial Oman Scouts before briefly becoming a hotel, a police station and is now an aviation museum, known as Al Mahatta Museum.

History 
The Imperial Airways Empire Route was originally established on the Northern Shore of the Persian Gulf, with Imperial Airways seaplanes landing off Hengam Island, but the agreement to use the route made with the Persian Government lapsed in 1932 when the Persian Government attempted to use the continuation of rights to the facility as leverage to gain British recognition for the Persian claim to the Tunbs Islands - a claim the British refused to countenance. As a consequence, a Southern route was sought.

Negotiations with several Trucial Sheikhs resulted in British offers to establish a presence being rejected. A site at Dibba, on the East Coast, was scouted and briefly considered - and would have provided a welcome relief to the harried Al Qasimi wali of Dibba, who was under aggressive pressure from both the Sharqiyin and Shihuh tribes. However the Dibba site was judged impractical and a location outside the coastal town of Sharjah was selected.

Sharjah's Ruler agreed - with reservations - to host the airfield. An agreement was made on 22 June 1932 with the Ruler, Sultan bin Saqr Al Qasimi, which secured him a monthly rental of 800 Rupees for landing rights and fees and a personal subsidy of 500 Rupees. Concerned that the airfield would result in British interference in Sharjah's internal affairs, Sultan bin Saqr also gained assurances that British shipping would route through Sharjah, providing income for the town's traders.

The negotiations between the British and Sultan bin Saqr were briefly interrupted when the British resident in the Persian Gulf, Hugh Biscoe, suffered a heart attack and died at sea en-route to Sharjah. Negotiations were recommenced by Harold Dickson, who had left Kuwait (where he was British Political Agent) to accompany Biscoe as an Arabic-speaking colleague. Dickson recounts at times having to be rude during drawn out and exhaustive negotiations, noting he had "told the Sheikh quite openly that it was impossible for me to continue business in an atmosphere which resembled that of chattering women, rather than the deliberations of serious men."

Sultan bin Saqr eventually agreed to build a rest-house for crew and passengers which was fortified against "possible but unlikely raids by bedouin" according to the 1937 documentary film Air Outpost, which featured Sharjah's airport. The ruler also supplied a number of armed men as guards.

Overnight stop 
Sharjah was an overnight stop between Baghdad and Jodphur on the Imperial Airways Eastern Route from Croydon Airport, Croydon, United Kingdom to Eagle Farm Airport, Brisbane, Australia. It was the first British establishment on the Trucial Coast. The route was originally flown by Handley Page HP42s, with two weekly flights landing in Sharjah on Sunday and Wednesday evenings on the outbound flight and Wednesday and Saturday evenings on the return flight.

A backup landing strip was established in Kalba in August 1936, resulting in Kalba's ruler, Said Bin Hamad Al Qasimi being recognised by the British as a Trucial Ruler.

By 1938, Sharjah was no longer an overnight stop on the route although the Imperial Airways flying boat service from Sydney to London included an overnight stop in Dubai, following the establishment of Civil Air Agreements with Dubai's ruler. The outbreak of skirmishing between Dubai and Sharjah in 1940 threatened the security of Sharjah's airport and led to unusual intervention by the British political agent in a land-based dispute: the British had previously restricted their interests and treaties purely to maritime affairs.

The airport was used extensively during World War II by the RAF, and a new agreement was made with the Ruler of Sharjah establishing an RAF base, which remained in use through to British withdrawal from the UAE in 1971.

No longer in use by Imperial Airways (or its successor BOAC), in 1951, it became the home of the Trucial Oman Scouts.

The airstrip remained in constant use until the development of the current Sharjah International Airport in 1977.

The fort building became the Seaface Hotel, then from 1973 was used as a police station, before falling into disrepair. It was restored in the late 1990s to open as a museum in 2000.

1937 Film: Air Outpost 

Produced in 1937 by documentary maker Paul Rotha for Strand Films, Air Outpost set out to tell the story of "24 hours at the airport and city of Sharjah, on the Persian Gulf". The film, featuring a score by British composer William Alywn, forms a rare and important historical document of Sharjah and the airport and fort at Mahatta which were at the time, according to the film, "A mile away from the Arab city of Sharjah" and which are now in its centre.

Although dated 1937, the film itself was actually shot in November 1936, Rotha having picked Sharjah for his film as he had travelled the Imperial Airways route a month after its inauguration and before the Mahatta Fort had been built, consequently sleeping in tents.

Al Mahatta Museum

On 14 March 2000, Al Mahatta Museum was opened, to celebrate the history of flight in the UAE and the region. It also contains a display of the first cinema in the Gulf region, inaugurated in 1945.

References

City museums in the United Arab Emirates
History museums in the United Arab Emirates
National museums of the United Arab Emirates
Forts in the United Arab Emirates
History of the Emirate of Sharjah
History of the United Arab Emirates